Pterostichus rhaeticus is a species of ground beetle native to Europe.

References

Pterostichus
Beetles described in 1837
Beetles of Europe